The Port Hedland–Marble Bar railway was a railway in the Pilbara region of Western Australia, running into the hinterland from the north-west coast.

History
The line was a Western Australian Government Railways (WAGR)  gauge branch line which was isolated from the rest of the WAGR system. Construction was commenced in 1909, undertaken by the firm of Henry Teesdale Smith, and the line was opened in July 1911.

The line had been proposed for some years before the date of opening.

Due to heavy losses on the line, the Western Australian government asked 1922 Royal Commission of Inquiry into the Railway Department to make a specific inquiry into the running of the Port Hedland railway. The commissioner found that "the railway cannot be run effectively so long as it is administered by the Railways Department" and recommended, among other things, that the running of the line be handed over to the Commissioner of the North-West. That was not done.

The reputation of the line for its slow running speed lived on long after the railway had closed, with Patsy Adam Smith's 1969 book about early railways noting the use of the ironic name the Spinifex Flyer.

The act for discontinuance of the railway was granted royal assent on 18 December 1950, and the last train to run out of Port Hedland operated on 25 October 1951. The railway closed on 31 October 1951.

Iron ore railways that have subsequently been constructed in the Pilbara region are standard gauge railways.

Stopping Places

 Port Hedland
 Pippingarra
 Pundano
 Strelley
 Carlindi
 Pin Pin
 Shaw River
 Warralong
 Gorge Creek
 Coongan
 Eginbah
 Marble Bar

See also

Don Rhodes Mining and Transport Museum
Goldsworthy railway
Mount Newman railway
Rail transport in Western Australia

References

Bibliography 

 
 
 
 Quinlan, Howard & Newland, John R.(2000)  Australian Railway Routes 1854-2000

External links
 https://www.abc.net.au/news/2016-08-11/archival-map-of-spinifex-express-route/7720178?nw=0 for archival map of the railway
 https://web.archive.org/web/20060820021925/http://railways.pilbara.net.au/index2.html for current railways in pilbara

Closed railway lines in Western Australia
Railway lines in the Pilbara
3 ft 6 in gauge railways in Australia
Railway lines opened in 1911
Railway lines closed in 1951
1911 establishments in Australia
1951 disestablishments in Australia
Marble Bar, Western Australia